Panchhat, commonly known as Panshta is a village in Phagwara Tehsil in the Kapurthala District, Punjab.

Villages in Kapurthala district